Sylvia Park railway station is located on the North Island Main Trunk line in New Zealand. Eastern Line services of the Auckland passenger network are the only regular services that stop at the station. It serves Sylvia Park mall and the surrounding suburb of Mount Wellington and has an island platform layout.

History 
The original Sylvia Park station was constructed, along with five others, in 1929 on the route of the Westfield Deviation, which was being built to divert the Auckland–Westfield section of the North Island Main Trunk line (NIMT) via a flatter, faster eastern route to link up with the original NIMT tracks at Westfield Junction. The station opened to goods traffic in September of that year, and opened to all traffic in November the following year.

This station was closed during the World War II period (1940–1945), due to the American government buying the land next to the railway and using it for army sheds. The old station closed entirely in March 1983, except for a private siding.

The new Sylvia Park station was funded by the builders of the  Sylvia Park Shopping Centre, located next to the station, and built by ARTNL/ARTA. It opened to the public on Monday 2 July 2007. The station cost NZ$5 million to build.

The station has a fairly high patronage, with many people travelling to shop at the Sylvia Park Shopping Centre.

Services 
Auckland One Rail, on behalf of Auckland Transport, operates suburban services to Britomart and Manukau via Sylvia Park. The basic weekday off-peak timetable is:
3 tph to Britomart
3 tph to Manukau

Bus routes 32, 66, 298, 743 and 782 serve Sylvia Park.

See also 
 List of Auckland railway stations

References

External links 
 Auckland Transport

Rail transport in Auckland
Railway stations in New Zealand
Railway stations opened in 1930
Railway stations closed in 1986
Railway stations opened in 2007